Neil Hague (1 December 1949 – 24 July 2022) was an English professional footballer, who played for Rotherham United, Plymouth Argyle, AFC Bournemouth, Huddersfield Town, and Darlington.

In 1980 he was contracted to play with ASL expansion team the Phoenix Fire, but the team folded in pre-season.

References

External links 
 

1949 births
2022 deaths
English footballers
Footballers from Rotherham
Association football defenders
Rotherham United F.C. players
Plymouth Argyle F.C. players
AFC Bournemouth players
Huddersfield Town A.F.C. players
Darlington F.C. players
Phoenix Fire (soccer) players
English expatriate footballers
English expatriate sportspeople in the United States
Expatriate soccer players in the United States